Aenictogiton is a genus of ants, comprising seven rarely collected species. All of the species are known only from males from Central Africa, and show a morphological and phylogenetic affinity to the army ant genus Dorylus. The dorylomorph ants include six subfamilies– Aenictogitoninae, Cerapachyinae, Leptanilloidinae, and the three army ant subfamilies Aenictinae, Dorylinae and Ecitoninae.

Origin 
Army ants predominantly reside in tropical and subtropical areas of Africa, the Americas, Asia, and Indo‐Australia, however, a few species range into more temperate regions. The Ecitoninae all reside in the New World with an exception to two army ant subfamilies  that are located in the Old World. Most of the species are located in Oriental and Indo‐Australian regions and a small variety in the Afrotropical region.

Behavioral and Reproductive Traits 
All species within the three army ant subfamilies have similar behavioral and reproductive traits such as, obligate collective foraging, nomadism, and highly modified queens called dichthadiigynes. Aenictogiton or army ants never forage or hunt alone, they instead use leaderless, co-operative mass of ants to overwhelm their prey all at once. The army ants never reside in one location and do not build permanent nests. Therefore, they forage and hunt in different locations and emigrate periodically.  The Queen are wingless and contain expandable abdomens that allow them to produce millions of eggs per month, which allows variation to occur within the species.

Species
Aenictogiton attenuatus 
Aenictogiton bequaerti 
Aenictogiton elongatus 
Aenictogiton emeryi 
Aenictogiton fossiceps 
Aenictogiton schoutedeni 
Aenictogiton sulcatus

References

External links

Dorylinae
Ant genera
Hymenoptera of Africa
Taxa named by Carlo Emery